Arthur Blennerhassett (1 January 1799 – 23 January 1843) was an Irish politician.

He was born the son of Arthur and Dorcas née Twiss Blennerhassett and educated at Trinity College, Dublin.

He was appointed High Sheriff of Kerry for 1821. In the 1832 elections for Tralee he fought a duel with the Liberal candidate Maurice O'Connell (MP). Neither was hurt and O'Connell went on to win the seat. Blennerhassett later served in British Parliament as Member of Parliament (MP) for Kerry from 1837 to 1841.

He died whilst staying in Nantes, France aged only 44. He had married Frances Grady in 1821; they lived at Ballyseedy and had 9 children. He was a cousin of Sir William Godfrey, 3rd Baronet.

References

 http://thepeerage.com/p2752.htm#i27517

External links 

1799 births
1843 deaths
Members of the Parliament of the United Kingdom for County Kerry constituencies (1801–1922)
UK MPs 1837–1841
High Sheriffs of Kerry
Arthur